HMS Bat was a Palmer-built three funnel, 30 knot torpedo boat destroyer ordered by the Royal Navy under the 1895 – 1896 Naval Estimates.  She was the third ship to carry this name since it was introduced in 1815 for a revenue cutter in service until 1848. Bat was classified along with similar vessels as a C-class destroyer in 1913.

Construction
HMS Bat was one of four 30-knotter destroyers (Bat,  and ) ordered from Palmer's of Jarrow-on-Tyne on 8 January 1896 as part of the 1895–1896 shipbuilding programme, following on from two destroyers ( and ) ordered from Palmer's on 23 December 1895 as part of the same programme.

Displacement was  light and  full load. Three funnels were fitted, and 91 tons of coal carried.

Armament was specified as a single QF 12 pounder 12 cwt gun on a platform on the ship's conning tower (in practice the platform was also used as the ship's bridge), backed up by five 6-pounder guns, and two 18-inch (450 mm) torpedo tubes. She had a crew of 60 to 63 officers and men.

Batwas laid down as Yard number 712 on 28 May 1896 at the Palmer shipyard at Jarrow and launched on 7 October 1896. She was completed and accepted by the Royal Navy in August 1897.

Service

Pre-War
After commissioning Bat was assigned to the 2nd Fleet and based at Devonport on training duties.

On 22 September 1897, Bat entered into the Fleet Reserve at Portsmouth. On 27 November 1987, Bat was commissioned at Portsmouth by the crew of the destroyer  for service with the Devonport Instructional Flotilla. In October 1898, the ship became the first destroyer in the Royal Navy to receive a torpedo fitted for a gyroscope.

In 1899 she was the leader of the Devonport Flotilla under the command of Commander Alexander Ludovic Duff during exercises in July. The following month she had her starboard propeller damaged while in Falmouth harbour, when the destroyer  dragged her moorings and drifted into Bat and other ships of the flotilla. Following repairs in Devonport, she was to go back to the flotilla, but had to withdraw for a longer period as there was an accident in the engine-room during power trials in late February. She paid off into the Dockyard reserve at Devonport on 8 March 1900. Her commanding officer, from 1901, was Commander Roger Keyes, who pioneered new aggressive tactics for destroyers during this period. Bat was paid off on 4 January 1902, when her crew was turned over to the destroyer , which took her place in the flotilla. After paying off, she underwent repairs to re-tube her Reed boilers.

Bat was deployed to the Mediterranean between 1902 and 1905. On 2 September 1902 she commissioned at Devonport to join the Mediterranean Fleet.

In 1910, Bat was part of the Fourth Destroyer Flotilla, based at Portsmouth and tendered to the depot ship . By March 1913, Bat was part of the Sixth Flotilla at Portsmouth, which was equipped with older destroyers for patrol purposes. The destroyer transferred to the Eighth Flotilla, based at Chatham in early 1914.

On 30 August 1912 the Admiralty directed all destroyer classes were to be designated by letters starting with 'A'. The class letter 'C' was painted on the hull below the bridge area and on a funnel.

World War I
On the outbreak of war, the Eighth Flotilla was deployed to the Firth of Forth, carrying out patrol duties in support of the Grand Fleet. By January 1915, Bat, although still supported by Tyne, was attached to the Grand Fleet. She remained attached to the Grand Fleet through the rest of 1915 and 1916.

Although one man was killed and a second was wounded, the submarine survived. In July 1917 Bat was redeployed to the East Coast Convoy Flotilla, this merging into the 7th Destroyer Flotilla based at the Humber the next month, continuing in escort operations for East coast convoys. She would remain there for the remainder of the war.

In 1919 Bat was paid off and laid-up in reserve awaiting disposal.  She was sold on 30 August 1919 to Hayes of Porthcawl for breaking.

Pennant numbers

Notes

References
 

Ships built on the River Tyne
1896 ships
C-class destroyers (1913)
World War I destroyers of the United Kingdom